Alcona Dam Pond (also Alcona Lake and Alcona Pond) is a lake located in Alcona County in the U.S. state of Michigan.
Outflow is regulated by the Alcona Dam.

References

Protected areas of Alcona County, Michigan
Reservoirs in Michigan
Bodies of water of Alcona County, Michigan